Kikuko Mikawa (born 29 April 1968) is a Japanese basketball player. She competed in the women's tournament at the 1996 Summer Olympics.

References

1968 births
Living people
Japanese women's basketball players
Olympic basketball players of Japan
Basketball players at the 1996 Summer Olympics
Sportspeople from Kyoto Prefecture
Asian Games medalists in basketball
Asian Games silver medalists for Japan
Basketball players at the 1994 Asian Games
Medalists at the 1994 Asian Games